"House of Salome" is the third and final single from the Kim Wilde album Catch as Catch Can.

It was not released in the UK, but was issued in several other European countries, though did not meet with success. The single would mark her last original release with RAK Records. It features Gary Barnacle on saxophone and flute.

"House of Salome" is also one of only two commercially released Kim Wilde singles not to be issued in any country on the 12" format (the other being "Water on Glass").

Song
The track is strong with a driving beat and intense lyrics. It deals with a mysterious figure by the name of Salome.

Charts

References

Kim Wilde songs
1983 songs
Songs written by Marty Wilde
Songs written by Ricky Wilde
RAK Records singles